Empire Clough was a  cargo ship which was built in 1942 by John Readhead & Sons Ltd of South Shields for the Ministry of War Transport (MoWT). She was torpedoed and sunk on her maiden voyage.

Description
The ship was built as yard number 527. She was launched on 2 April 1942 and completed in June 1942.

She had a GRT of 6,147 and a NRT of 4,251.

The engine was built by Foster, Yates & Thompson Ltd, Blackburn.

History
Empire Clough was built for the Ministry of War Transport and placed under the management of the Larringa Steamship Co Ltd. Her port of registry was South Shields and she was allocated the Code Letters BDVX and United Kingdom Official Number 168655.

On her maiden voyage, Empire Clough was a member of Convoy ON 100, which departed from Loch Ewe on 2 June 1942 bound for Boston and New York. They were landed at St John's, Newfoundland and in Greenland respectively. Those lost on Empire Clough are commemorated at the Tower Hill Memorial in London.

References

1942 ships
Ships built on the River Tyne
Empire ships
Ministry of War Transport ships
Steamships of the United Kingdom
Maritime incidents in June 1942
Ships sunk by German submarines in World War II
World War II shipwrecks in the Atlantic Ocean